Botorpsströmmen is a river in Sweden.

References

Rivers of Sweden